The 2014–15 Cypriot Fourth Division was the 30th season of the Cypriot fourth-level football league. Alki Oroklini won their 1st title. The 2014–15 season was the last one ever for the Cypriot Fourth Division, as the league was dissolved and replaced by the STOK Elite Division.

Format
Fourteen teams participated in the 2014–15 Cypriot Fourth Division. All teams played against each other twice, once at their home and once away. The team with the most points at the end of the season crowned champions. The first five teams were promoted to the 2015–16 Cypriot Third Division. All the other teams participated in 2015–16 STOK Elite Division.

Point system
Teams received three points for a win, one point for a draw and zero points for a loss.

Changes from previous season
Teams promoted to 2014–15 Cypriot Third Division
 Enosi Neon Ypsona
 Amathus Ayiou Tychona

Teams relegated from 2013–14 Cypriot Third Division
 Spartakos Kitiou 
 Adonis Idaliou
 Konstantios & Evripidis Trachoniou2

1Konstantios & Evripidis Trachoniou withdrew from the 2014–15 Cypriot Fourth Division.

Teams promoted from regional leagues
 AEN Ayiou Georgiou Vrysoullon-Acheritou
 Kouris Erimis

Teams relegated to regional leagues
 OXEN Peristeronas
 Kissos Kissonergas

Notes:
Before the start of the season, Enosi Neon Ypsona and Digenis Akritas Ypsona were merged forming ENY-Digenis Ypsona, which took the place of Enosi Neon Ypsona in the Cypriot Third Division.
Omonia Oroklinis renamed to Alki Oroklini.

Stadia and locations

League standings

Results

See also
 Cypriot Fourth Division
 2014–15 Cypriot First Division
 2014–15 Cypriot Cup for lower divisions
 Cypriot football league system

References

Sources
 

Cypriot Fourth Division seasons
Cyprus
2014–15 in Cypriot football